Roseville Township is the name of some places in the U.S. state of Minnesota:
Roseville Township, Grant County, Minnesota
Roseville Township, Kandiyohi County, Minnesota

See also

 Roseville Township (disambiguation)

Minnesota township disambiguation pages